Gangapada Basu (as known as Gangapada Bose) (12 March 1910- 23 May 1971) was a Bengali film and theatre actor.  He was an actor in the Gananatya Sangha and Bohurupee theatre groups.

Films
 Tothapi (1950)
 Chinnamul (1950)
 Nagarik (1952)
 Aaj Sandhyay (1953)
 Naba Bidhan (1954)
 Debatra (1955)
 Nishiddha Phal (1955)
 Shreebatsa Chinta (1955)
 Asha (1956)
 Data Karna (1957)
 Prithibi Amare Chaay (1957)
 Ajantrik (1958)
 Jalsaghar (1958)
 Parash Pathar (1958) as Businessman Kachalu
 Kuhak (1960)
 Manik Surya Sikha (1963)
 Birieswar Vivekananda (1964)
 Nishi Padma (1970)
 Bibaha Bibhrat'' (1971)
 Ekhane Pinjar (1971)

See also
Ritwik Ghatak

References

External links

Bengali male actors
University of Calcutta alumni
Bengali theatre personalities
Male actors in Bengali cinema
Indian male film actors
Indian male stage actors
20th-century Indian male actors
1910 births
1971 deaths